Omoglymmius crassiusculus is a species of beetle in the subfamily Rhysodidae. It was described by Lewis in 1888.

References

crassiusculus
Beetles described in 1888